Đồng Phúc is a commune (xã) and village in Yên Dũng District, Bắc Giang Province, which is part of northeastern Vietnam.

References

Populated places in Bắc Giang province
Communes of Bắc Giang province